Kilnsea is a hamlet in the East Riding of Yorkshire, England, in an area known as Holderness.

The hamlet forms part of the civil parish of Easington.

East of Kilnsea is the Grade II listed First World War concrete acoustic mirror used as an early warning device.

Kilnsea has one public house, the Crown and Anchor.

In 1823 Kilnsea was a civil parish in the Wapentake and Liberty of Holderness. The parish church, dedicated to Saint Helen, was close to the cliff and in a "state of dilapidation" and "dangerous condition". Repairs were considered useless with the expectation that the sea, which had already swept away the graveyard, would take the church "in a short time". Population in 1823 was 196.

The old St Helen's Church was lost to the sea in 1826, and was replaced by a new church in 1865, at a cost of £420, that incorporated some salvaged remains of the old building. The church was listed as a Grade II building on 14 December 2018.

References

External links

Villages in the East Riding of Yorkshire
Holderness